The hundred of Fremington was the name of one of thirty two ancient administrative units of Devon, England.

The parishes in the hundred were:
 Alverdiscott
 Fremington
 Great Torrington
 Horwood
 Huntshaw
 Instow
 Newton Tracey
 Roborough
 St Giles in the Wood
 Tawstock
 Westleigh

See also 
 List of hundreds of England and Wales - Devon

References 

Hundreds of Devon